Sharan Leslie Burrow  (born 12 December 1954) was the general secretary of the International Trade Union Confederation (ITUC) (2010-2022) and a former president of the Australian Council of Trade Unions (ACTU) (2000–2010). She was the first woman to become General Secretary of the ITUC since its foundation in 2006, and was the second woman to become President of the ACTU.

Early involvement in Australian labour movement

Burrow was born in Warren, New South Wales to a family with strong involvement in the labour movement. She graduated in teaching with the University of New South Wales in 1976 and became a teacher in the early 1980s, which allowed her to become involved in the New South Wales Teachers Federation. She later became President of the Bathurst Trades and Labor Council. Before becoming President of the ACTU she was also President of the Australian Education Union (AEU) in 1992.

Presidency of the Australian Council of Trade Unions

Burrow was elected President of the ACTU in May 2000. The most significant public event of her term of office was the ACTU's 'Your Rights at Work' campaign against the Howard Government's 'WorkChoices' industrial relations legislation in the lead up to the 2007 Australian federal election. At the election, the Howard government was defeated, and the incoming Rudd Government repealed the WorkChoices legislation and replaced it with the Fair Work Act 2009, which was praised by the ACTU for its restoration and protection of many workers' rights (such as the right to organise and negotiate collectively) which has been removed or jeopardised by the earlier legislation.

At the time of her presidency with ACTU, a PPL (Paid Parental Leave) policy program was passed in Australia, for which she said; this would give dignity and respect to women workers.

Burrow continued as President of the ACTU until the end of June 2010 when she demitted office and was elected General Secretary (i.e. leader) of the International Trade Union Confederation.

Involvement in international labour movement

Before her election as General Secretary of the International Trade Union Confederation on 25 June 2010,

Burrow was President of the ITUC from its foundation in 2006 until her election as General Secretary in 2010 and had previously been the first female President of the International Confederation of Free Trade Unions (ICFTU), a forerunner institution of the ITUC, between 2004 and its absorption into the ITUC in 2006.

Recognising the significance of her election as the first female leader of the world's largest international trade union organisation, in her acceptance speech after becoming General Secretary of the ITUC, Burrow underlined the necessity of female participation in organised labour:

Since 2014, Burrow has been a member of the Global Commission for the Economy and Climate, co-chaired by Ngozi Okonjo-Iweala, Nicholas Stern and Paul Polman.

Other activities

Corporate boards
 Danone, Member of the Mission Committee (since 2020)

Non-profit organizations
 International Centre for Trade Union Rights (ICTUR), President
 European Climate Foundation, Member of the Supervisory Board
 World Justice Project, Honorary Co-Chair
The B Team, Vice-Chair

References

External links

1954 births
Living people
Australian trade union leaders
Australian women trade unionists
University of New South Wales alumni
Companions of the Order of Australia
Leaders of the International Trade Union Confederation
People from Warren, New South Wales